Rumex cristatus, the Greek dock, is a species of perennial herb in the family Polygonaceae.

Sources

References 

cristatus
Flora of Malta